Erenhot (commonly shortened to Ereen or Erlian) is a county-level city of the Xilin Gol League, in  Inner Mongolia Autonomous Region, located in the Gobi Desert along the Sino-Mongolian border, across from the Mongolian town of Zamyn-Üüd.

Climate
Erenhot experiences a cold desert climate (Köppen BWk) with long, very dry, and bitter winters and short, hot summers. The city receives 3,232 hours (about 73% of the possible total) of bright sunshine per year, and clear, sunny, dry weather dominates year-round; due to the aridity, the diurnal temperature variation frequently approaches and exceeds . Over two-thirds of the sparse  of annual rainfall occurs from June to August alone. With monthly percent possible sunshine ranging from 67% in July to 78% in February, the city is one of the sunniest nationwide and receives 3,232 hours of bright sunshine annually.

Economy
The border town is a rail port city and the largest hub for cross border trade between Mongolia and China.  When authorities opened the town up in 1992 to international trade, Erenhot underwent a transformation growing from 8,000 people then to an estimated 100,000 people including migrant workers.

The  Dabusan Nur salt lake to the north of Erenhot provided an economic boom to the city's chemical industry during the late 1990s. The lake has provided Erenhot with a large water supply which also contributed to the rapid growth of the city and economy.

As a destination for wholesalers moving goods across the border, the city hosts a large trading market, International Trade City.  Built in 2006 the mall is "a block-long, three-story wholesale market that houses 527 tenants who sell silk fabrics, rabbit and fox furs and other commodities."

Transport 

Erenhot is a stop on the Trans-Mongolian Railway, making it one of two international railway crossings in Inner Mongolia as of 2010 (the other is at Manzhouli on the Sino-Russian border). The rail link has struggled under the strain of growing trade with Mongolia and several new rail lines are under construction to ease the burden including two railways from different parts of China to a border port in East Ujimqin Banner.

International trains change bogies in here, because of the break-of-gauge between China and Mongolia. China uses the standard gauge, while Mongolia uses the Russian 1520 mm gauge. The manual bogie exchange is to be supplemented with the faster, automatic Variable gauge axle system of the SUW 2000-type made by ZNTK.

The town is also the northern terminus of China National Highway 208, which runs south to Changzhi, Shanxi.

Erenhot Saiwusu International Airport has scheduled flights to Beijing, Hohhot and Tongliao.

Dinosaurs  

The area around the town, especially a salt lake known to paleontologists as Iren Dabasu or Iren Nor ( = colourful,  = salt,  = lake) to the east, is known for the discovery of a number of different dinosaurs. The city houses a dinosaur museum, and in 2006 a big arch in form of two Sauropoda was built on the highway southward. In 2007, a number of smaller figures of different species were added.

See also 
 List of dinosaur-bearing rock formations
 Gigantoraptor
 Alectrosaurus

References

External links 
 Official website
 
 Dinosaurs Roam Scenic Boulevard August 7, 2007 (China.org.cn)
 An Erenhot Travelogue AsiaObscura.com

Cities in Inner Mongolia
China–Mongolia border crossings